Oloh is an unincorporated community located in Lamar County, Mississippi, United States.

In 1907, Oloh had two churches, a school, and a turpentine plant. A post office operated under the name Oloh from 1895 to 1920.

Oloh is served by a community center that also doubles as a voting precinct.

References

Unincorporated communities in Lamar County, Mississippi
Unincorporated communities in Mississippi
Hattiesburg metropolitan area